Girls Planet 999 was a South Korean reality television show, where trainees from China, Japan and South Korea competed to debut in a nine-member girl group. The 99 contestants formed three large groups, consisting 33 contestants from each nationality. After the final episode, the final top nine contestants were selected to debut as members of the girl group Kep1er.

Contestants
The English names of all contestants are presented in Eastern order in accordance with the official website.

The ages of all contestants are presented in accordance with the international age system as of Episode 1 (August 6, 2021).

Color key:

Cells

Cell Arrangements 
Color key:

Cells are teams of three, each comprising a K-Group, a C-Group, and a J-Group contestant. Cells were reshuffled in Episode 2, with priority given to the Planet Top 9 of Episode 2 to select cellmates. 

All cells were disbanded in Episode 6 after the first elimination.

Original cells were made prior to the Planet Demo Stage and the contestants were grouped by a Connect Keyword, which is a common interest or trait among the girls in the cell. Connect Keywords were taken from the official Girls Planet 999 social media accounts.

The tables below are numbered in alphabetical order of the K-Group contestants; bold names denotes the Planet Top 9 that chose her new cellmates.

Cell Rankings 
Color key:

Cell rankings were revealed after Episode 5 and are based on the number of cell points obtained.

Cells that were eliminated in Episode 5 did not have their cell points displayed.

Planet Demo Stage (Episodes 1–2)
Color key:
The teams were formed based on nationality prior to Episode 1; the team names were taken from Mnet's official YouTube channel, Mnet K-POP.

Note that not all of the Planet Top 9 candidates are fully known as not all performances were fully aired.

Bold team numbers are teams whose performances were partially or entirely unaired on broadcast.

Connect Mission (Episodes 2–4) 
Color key:
The teams were formed in Episode 2 and the group battle performances were shown in Episodes 3 and 4.

The winning teams had their votes multiplied for the last 24 hours before voting closed on August 28 at 10 AM KST; the winning teams who performed a girl group song received a x2 multiplier while the winning team who performed a boy group song received a x3 multiplier.

Out of the winning teams, "Yes or Yes" Team 1 (Keep Missing You) was chosen to perform at M Countdown. Their performance was aired on September 9, 2021.

Combination Mission (Episodes 6–7) 
Color key:
The teams were formed in Episode 6. Contestants are grouped into either teams of 3, 6 or 9. The performances were shown in Episodes 6 and 7.

Unlike the Connect Mission, the Combination Mission songs were specific to certain aspects of a performance such as Vocal or Dance.

The contestants in the winning teams each received a point benefit of 270,000 points divided by the number of members in the group.

Creation Mission (Episodes 9–10) 
Color key:
The Creation Mission songs were revealed at the end of Episode 6.

Viewers voted on Universe who they wanted to perform the four songs that were showcased. Voting closed on September 11 at 10:30 PM KST. The winning team had their votes doubled for the last 24 hours of voting until 10 AM KST on October 9.

O.O.O Mission (Episode 11) 
Color key:
For the O.O.O Mission, the girls were organized into three separate groups, performing the show's theme song, "O.O.O (Over&Over&Over)". The organization of the teams was voted by viewers from September 24 to September 27. The full stage videos of the performances were released on October 9.

Viewers were then supposed to evaluate the contestants' performances by liking the individual stage video of the contestant. The evaluation period ran until 10 AM KST on October 10. Only three winners were selected, one from each team. The winners from a 9-member team gained a benefit 90,000 points while the winner of the 8-member team gained a benefit of 80,000 points. 

Bold names denotes the member who got the benefit.

Completion Mission (Episode 12)
Color key:

The Completion Mission was announced at the end of Episode 11. The eighteen remaining contestants formed two teams of nine that performed the same song in the same performance.

The ending part was given to Team 2 based on selection by the mentors.

Notes

References

Girls Planet 999
Girls Planet 999 contestants